Araeoncus is a genus of dwarf spiders that was first described by Eugène Louis Simon in 1884. They closely resemble members of Diplocephalus; both genera have a uniquely shaped of the cephalothorax and a species-specific modification of the tibial apophysis of the pedipalp.

Species
 it contains thirty-nine species:
Araeoncus altissimus Simon, 1884 – France, Italy, Azerbaijan
Araeoncus anguineus (L. Koch, 1869) – Europe
Araeoncus banias Tanasevitch, 2013 – Israel
Araeoncus caucasicus Tanasevitch, 1987 – Ukraine, Caucasus, Iran, Central Asia
Araeoncus clavatus Tanasevitch, 1987 – Turkey, Armenia
Araeoncus clivifrons Deltshev, 1987 – Bulgaria
Araeoncus convexus Tullgren, 1955 – Sweden, Estonia
Araeoncus crassiceps (Westring, 1861) – Europe, Russia (Europe to South Siberia)
Araeoncus curvatus Tullgren, 1955 – Sweden, Estonia
Araeoncus cypriacus Tanasevitch, 2011 – Cyprus
Araeoncus discedens (Simon, 1881) – Spain, France, Italy
Araeoncus dispar Tullgren, 1955 – Sweden
Araeoncus duriusculus Caporiacco, 1935 – Karakorum
Araeoncus etinde Bosmans & Jocqué, 1983 – Cameroon
Araeoncus femineus (Roewer, 1942) – Equatorial Guinea (Bioko)
Araeoncus galeriformis (Tanasevitch, 1987) – Russia (Caucasus), Azerbaijan
Araeoncus gertschi Caporiacco, 1949 – Kenya
Araeoncus hanno Simon, 1884 – Algeria
Araeoncus humilis (Blackwall, 1841) (type) – Europe, North Africa, Russia (Europe to South Siberia), Japan. Introduced to New Zealand
Araeoncus hyalinus Song & Li, 2010 – China
Araeoncus impolitus Holm, 1962 – Kenya
Araeoncus longispineus Song & Li, 2010 – China
Araeoncus longiusculus (O. Pickard-Cambridge, 1875) – France (Corsica), Italy (Sardinia, mainland)
Araeoncus macrophthalmus Miller, 1970 – Angola
Araeoncus malawiensis Jocqué, 1981 – Malawi
Araeoncus martinae Bosmans, 1996 – Morocco, Algeria
Araeoncus mitriformis Tanasevitch, 2008 – Turkey, Iran
Araeoncus obtusus Bosmans & Jocqué, 1983 – Cameroon
Araeoncus picturatus Holm, 1962 – Tanzania
Araeoncus rhodes Tanasevitch, 2011 – Greece (Rhodes)
Araeoncus sicanus Brignoli, 1979 – Italy (Sicily)
Araeoncus subniger Holm, 1962 – Kenya
Araeoncus tauricus Gnelitsa, 2004 – Bulgaria, Greece (Crete), Turkey, Ukraine
Araeoncus toubkal Bosmans, 1996 – Portugal, Morocco
Araeoncus tuberculatus Tullgren, 1955 – Sweden
Araeoncus vaporariorum (O. Pickard-Cambridge, 1875) – France, Italy
Araeoncus victorianyanzae Berland, 1936 – Kenya, Tanzania
Araeoncus viphyensis Jocqué, 1981 – Malawi
Araeoncus vorkutensis Tanasevitch, 1984 – Russia (Europe to South Siberia), Kazakhstan

See also
 List of Linyphiidae species

References

Araneomorphae genera
Cosmopolitan spiders
Linyphiidae